Kılınç is a Turkish surname. It may refer to:

David Kılınç (born 1992), Swiss footballer of Turkish descent 
Emre Kılınç (born 1994), Turkish footballer 
Koray Kılınç (born 2000), Turkish footballer
Tuncer Kılınç (born 1938), Turkish general

See also
Sevda Kılınç Çırakoğlu (born 1993), Turkish female para athlete
Sarsılmaz Kılınç 2000, a semi-automatic pistol